Airport Tower is a  tall sandstone butte located in the Island in the Sky District of Canyonlands National Park, in San Juan County, Utah. It is situated 1.64 mile east of Washer Woman, which is a towering arch similar in height. Each are composed of Wingate Sandstone, which is the remains of wind-borne sand dunes deposited approximately 200 million years ago in the Late Triassic. A short hike to Mesa Arch provides the easiest view of Airport Tower. Access to this tower is via the four-wheel drive White Rim Road, which is another option to see Airport Tower. The top of this geological formation rises 1,400 feet above the road in less than one mile. Precipitation runoff from Airport Tower drains southeast into the nearby Colorado River via Buck and Lathrop Canyons. This geographical feature's name was officially adopted in 1986 by the U.S. Board on Geographic Names. It was so named because the rock formation resembles the appearance of an airport control tower.

Climbing
The first ascent of Airport Tower was made in July 1994 by Galen Howell, Sonja Paspal, and Steve Swanke, via Wind Shear (5.11, A1, 5 pitches).

The second ascent was made in September 1995 by Mike Baker and Leslie Henderson via Sky Pilot (IV 5.9 A3).

The first free ascent of Airport Tower was made in 1998 by Bret Ruckman and Marco Corncchione via Wind Shear, calling it a five-star route.

Climate
Spring and fall are the most favorable seasons to visit Airport Tower. According to the Köppen climate classification system, it is located in a Cold semi-arid climate zone, which is defined by the coldest month having an average mean temperature below −0 °C (32 °F) and at least 50% of the total annual precipitation being received during the spring and summer.

Gallery

See also
 Colorado Plateau
 Geology of the Canyonlands area

References

External links
 Canyonlands National Park National Park Service
 Airport Tower weather forecast: National Weather Service
 Airport Tower from White Rim Road: YouTube

Landforms of San Juan County, Utah
Colorado Plateau
Canyonlands National Park
Sandstone formations of the United States
Buttes of Utah
Rock formations of Utah